The 2022 American Athletic Conference men's basketball tournament was held March 10–13, 2022, at Dickies Arena in Fort Worth, Texas. All games of the tournament were televised by ESPN Inc. The winner of the tournament, the Houston Cougars, received the conference's automatic bid to the 2022 NCAA tournament.

Seeds
Teams were seeded by conference record (tiebreakers were not required as no teams had identical conference records). The top five teams received byes to the quarterfinals. 

With the COVID-19 pandemic in the United States still ongoing and the possibility of cancelled games, teams were required to play a minimum of 75% of the average number of conference games played in order to be seeded by winning percentage for the conference tournament; those with less games would be seeded below those meeting the minimum.  However, only three games were completely cancelled, so all teams met the 75% requirement.

Schedule

Bracket 
* – Denotes overtime period

Game Summaries

First Round

Quarterfinals

Semifinals

Championship Game 

*Game times: CT

See also 
2022 American Athletic Conference women's basketball tournament
 American Athletic Conference men's basketball tournament
 American Athletic Conference

References

External links 
 American Athletic Conference tournament Central

Tournament
American Athletic Conference men's basketball tournament
American Athletic Conference men's basketball tournament
College sports tournaments in Texas
Basketball competitions in Fort Worth, Texas